What Really Happens in Bali is a documentary television series that airs on the Seven Network on Monday nights at 9:00pm.

Show details
The show premiered on Tuesday, 27 May at 8:45pm, however after three episodes, the show was moved to Mondays at 9:00pm, replacing Revenge, its third series having wrapped up broadcasting on Seven the previous Monday.

A spin-off of the series, What Really Happens in Thailand, filmed in Thailand premiered in September 2015.

A second spin-off premiered in 2016, titled What Really Happens on the Gold Coast.

Synopsis
The documentary television series gives viewers unprecedented access into Bali, including various holiday spots and the infamous Kerobokan Prison, where the Bali Nine are currently incarcerated.

References

Seven Network original programming
2010s Australian documentary television series
2014 Australian television series debuts